Gagan Narang (born 6 May 1983) is an Indian sport shooter, supported by the Olympic Gold Quest. He won the bronze medal in the Men's 10 m Air Rifle Event at the 2012 Summer Olympics in London with a final score of 701.1 on 30 July 2012.

Early life and background
Gagan was born to Bhimsen Narang and his wife Amarjit, in a Punjabi Hindu Arora family in Chennai on 6 May 1983. His father is a retired chief manager of the Air India. Gagan's family hail from the Simla Gujran village of Haryana's Panipat district. However, his father's job assignments made them to shift from Panipat to Hyderabad, where he was brought up. He did his schooling from the Gitanjali Senior School. He attained his Bachelor of Computer Application degree from the Hyderabad's Osmania University. He took to shooting when his father presented him an air pistol in 1997. He went about perfecting his shooting skills at the backyard of his home in Begumpet. According to his father, Gagan showed early sparks of his shooting ability when, at the age of two, he shot a balloon with a toy pistol.

Career
Narang won a gold medal in the Afro Asian games, 2003 in Hyderabad on 26 October 2003 in Men's 10m air rifle competition. He won the Air Rifle Gold medal at the World Cup 2006 and followed it up with win in the event in April 2010.

In a pre-Olympic event in Hannover, Germany, Gagan shot an Air Rifle score higher than the world record, 704.3 as opposed to 703.1 set by Thomas Farnik of Austria in the World Cup 2006. Gagan Narang won 4 Gold medals at 2006 Commonwealth Games.

Narang qualified for the 2008 ISSF World Cup Final after he won a gold in the World Cup in China earlier in 2008. Gagan shot a perfect 600 in the qualification round. He scored 103.5 in the final round making total score of 703.5 to gain the universe record.  On 4 November 2008, he broke Austria's Thomas Farnik's record, set in the 2006 World Cup final in Granada, Spain. Gagan said his win was special because Barack Obama, who won the United States' Presidential election on same day, was a source of inspiration.

Narang added 4 Gold medals to the Indian tally at the 2010 Commonwealth Games in New Delhi. In the Men's 10 m Air Rifle singles event, he shot a perfect 600 which was a new record. Gagan also clinched a silver medal in his pet event at the Asian Games 2010. He also combined with Abhinav Bindra and Sanjeev Rajput to win the country another silver, in the team event behind champions, China. He won both of his silvers on the opening day of Asian Games.

Narang won the bronze medal in the 10m air rifle event at the 2012 London Olympics with a total score of 701.1 becoming India's first medal winner at the 2012 games. This win made his only the 3rd shooter from India to medal at the Olympics. Gagan was just behind the silver medallist Niccolo Campriani of Italy who scored 701.5, while the gold medallist Alin George Moldoveanu of Romania was at 702.1.
However he failed to qualify for the finals of the men's 50-metre rifle three positions at the Royal Artillery Barracks.

Narang won 1 silver medal and 1 bronze medal in 50-metre rifle prone and 50-metre rifle 3 position respectively at the 2014 Commonwealth Games in Glasgow.

ISSF World Medal Tally

World record

Controversy
In August 2010, Narang had publicly expressed his displeasure after being ignored for the prestigious Rajiv Gandhi Khel Ratna award thrice and he threatened to skip the 2010 Commonwealth Games due to lack of motivation. However, intense pressure from his family and fans, he later decided to participate.

Summer Olympics

Awards & Recognitions
In recognition with his achievements, Narang was conferred with the Padma Shree Award in 2011.
Gagan Narang was selected for the prestigious Rajiv Gandhi Khel Ratna award for 2010. This is the highest sports award in the country. He was conferred the award by then president Pratibha Patil on 29 August 2011. Also Gagan Narang was invited by the organisers of the Indian Grand Prix to wave the chequered flag in the 2012 Indian Grand Prix.

Awards for 2012 Olympics Bronze medal
  cash prize by State Government of Haryana.
  cash prize by the State Government of Andhra Pradesh.
  cash prize by the State Government of Rajasthan.
  cash prize by Steel Ministry of India.
 2 kg of gold by Sahara India Pariwar.

References

External links
 

1983 births
Living people
Sportspeople from Chennai
Sport shooters from Telangana
Indian male sport shooters
ISSF rifle shooters
Olympic shooters of India
Olympic medalists in shooting
Olympic bronze medalists for India
Medalists at the 2012 Summer Olympics
Shooters at the 2004 Summer Olympics
Shooters at the 2008 Summer Olympics
Shooters at the 2012 Summer Olympics
Shooters at the 2016 Summer Olympics
Commonwealth Games gold medallists for India
Shooters at the 2006 Commonwealth Games
Shooters at the 2010 Commonwealth Games
Asian Games medalists in shooting
Shooters at the 2006 Asian Games
Shooters at the 2010 Asian Games
Punjabi people
Recipients of the Arjuna Award
Recipients of the Padma Shri in sports
Recipients of the Khel Ratna Award
Shooters at the 2014 Asian Games
Asian Games silver medalists for India
Asian Games bronze medalists for India
Commonwealth Games silver medallists for India
Commonwealth Games bronze medallists for India
Commonwealth Games medallists in shooting
Medalists at the 2006 Asian Games
Medalists at the 2010 Asian Games
Medallists at the 2006 Commonwealth Games
Medallists at the 2010 Commonwealth Games